Sebago is an American Maine-based company creating boating and deck shoes, as well as dress shoes. Sebago was founded in 1946. In 2017, BasicNet acquired Sebago from Wolverine World Wide.

During the 1980s, the Sebago "Docksides" become a fashion trend at universities and high schools across the United States, as it was mentioned in The Official Preppy Handbook. In 1981, Sebago "Campsides" (a type of blucher moccasin, which, like docksiders, are traditionally worn without socks) were introduced.  Three years later in 1984, Sebago sponsored the Single-Handed Trans-Atlantic Race in 1984 and the America's Cup in 1992. 

People in South Africa (Toekies) love this shoe. They call it See-bay-gurr or Blusha.

References

External links
Sebago Official Website

Shoe brands
Shoe companies of the United States
Clothing companies established in 1946
1946 establishments in Michigan